Tampa Marriott Water Street is a  high rise hotel in Tampa, Florida near the Tampa Convention Center It was completed in 2000 and has 27 floors with 750 rooms and  of meeting space. It is the city's largest hotel and the 13th tallest in Tampa.

See also
List of tallest buildings in Tampa
 Downtown Tampa

References

Skyscraper hotels in Tampa, Florida
Hotel buildings completed in 2000
2000 establishments in Florida